Valle de Valdebezana is a municipality located in the province of Burgos, Castile and León, Spain.

References

Municipalities in the Province of Burgos